Adelmota of Carrara (early 14th-century) was an Italian physician. She was a physician and obstetrician from Padua. The daughter of the Count of Castelnuovo, she married Prince Giovanni of Carrara. 

Little is known about Adelmota.  The seventeenth-century writer Joannes Rhodius stated that she was a most learned physician.

References

14th-century Italian physicians
Medieval women physicians
Italian women scientists
14th-century Italian women
People from Padua